Bykovo is an urban locality (a work settlement) and the administrative center of Bykovsky District in Volgograd Oblast, Russia, located on the Volgograd Reservoir. Population:

References

Urban-type settlements in Volgograd Oblast